CrossCountry is a train operating company that has operated Great Britain’s Cross Country rail franchise since 11 November 2007.

The basic routes are:

There are also extensions to the normal service pattern:

to Penzance from Plymouth
to Glasgow Central from Edinburgh Waverley
to Aberdeen from Edinburgh Waverley
to Cardiff Central from Bristol Temple Meads
to Paignton from Bristol Temple Meads
to Southampton Central from London Paddington